"Rewind" is the second single by New Zealand singer-songwriter Jamie McDell. It was released digitally on 13 July 2012, as the first single from her debut album Six Strings and a Sailboat. It was written and composed by McDell, and recorded at York Street Studio in Auckland. "Rewind" topped the Top 20 New Zealand Singles chart, which features singles by New Zealand artists, on 23 July 2012. McDell considers "Rewind" to be her official debut single.

Background
McDell announced via Facebook on 24 April 2012, that her second single would be "Rewind". She explains:

An acoustic version was also recorded for her debut EP, All That I Wanted - Acoustic EP, along with an acoustic music video.

Songwriting and lyrics
The song is about a past relationship that she had over the summer that failed. In an interview with New Zealand radio station, The Edge FM, she explained that the lyric "rewind five times" represents five separate occasions that she would like to forget. The meaning behind the song was posted by McDell via Facebook on 24 April 2012:

Music video
The official music video for "Rewind" was filmed at Pakiri Beach, New Zealand, and was released on 12 July 2012. McDell states it is her first professional music video in comparison to the laid-back, do-it-yourself feel of "You'll Never Take That Away". She explains the video "pretty much represents exactly what the song is about" and focuses on her looking back on the relationship. It features flashback scenes of happy memories which eventuate to a critical point in the relationship where it falls apart, ending with McDell finding comfort in music.

An additional music video was also filmed for the acoustic version of the song that features on All That I wanted – Acoustic EP.

Chart performance
"Rewind" entered and debuted on the Official New Zealand Top 40 at No. 30 on 23 July 2012, and is her second song to enter the chart. The single also topped the Top 20 New Zealand Singles chart (which features singles by New Zealand artists) on 23 July 2012.

References

2012 songs
Jamie McDell songs